George Rennie may refer to:

George Rennie (agriculturalist) (1749–1828), British agriculturalist
George Rennie (engineer) (1791–1866), British civil engineer
George Rennie (sculptor) (1802–1860), British sculptor and Member of Parliament
George Rennie (lacrosse) (1883–1966), Canadian lacrosse player
George Rennie (Canadian politician) (1866–1930), Conservative member of the Canadian House of Commons
George Rennie (ship), a wreck off the coast of Magnetic Island